My Toot Toot was Jean Knight's third studio album and her first in four years. The title track was previously a Zydeco hit for Rockin' Sidney. Other cover versions on this album include a rerecorded version of Knight's biggest hit "Mr. Big Stuff" (which contains a rap intro) and Shirley & Lee's hit "Let the Good Times Roll." It would be twelve years before Knight released another studio album, though she did continue touring and making live performances.

Track listing

Side One
 "My Toot Toot" - (Sidney Simien) - 4:21
 "One Monkey Don't Stop the Show" - (Allen Toussaint) - 2:56
 "Mr. Big Stuff" - (Joseph Broussard, Ralph Williams, Carrol Washington) - 3:01
 "Let the Good Times Roll" - (Leonard Lee) - 4:05

Side Two
 "Working Your Mojo" - (Isaac Bolden, Joseph Broussard) - 4:00
 "Magic" - (Isaac Bolden, D. Johnson, B. Williams) - 4:08
 "My Heart Is Willing" - (Isaac Bolden) - 4:35
 "Isn't Life So Wonderful" - (Isaac Bolden) - 3:28
 "Funny Bone" - (Walter Moorehead) - 4:07

Personnel
Produced by: Isaac Bolden for Bolden & Moorehead Productions
Recorded and mixed at: Sea-Saint Recording Studio, New Orleans, Louisiana
Recorded by: Bob Kearney and Clarence R. Toussaint
Mixed by: Bob Kearney
"One Monkey Don't Stop the Show" mixed by: Clarence R. Toussaint
Production assistants: B. Williams, D. Johnson
Photography: David Michael Kennedy
Art direction: Bob Defrin
Musicians
Daryl Johnson - keyboards, backing vocals, bass synthesizer
Isaac Bolden - keyboards
Brennan A. Williams - Linn drum programming
Kevin Hayes - keyboards, backing vocals, bass synthesizer
Jimmy Molière - guitar
Cynthia Sheeler and Charles Elam III - backing vocals
Barry Sailor - bass guitar on "Working Your Mojo"
Donald Provost - harmonica on "Isn't Life So Wonderful"
Allen Toussaint - all music on "One Monkey Don't Stop the Show"

Charts
Album - Billboard (North America)

Singles - Billboard (North America)

1985 albums
Jean Knight albums